Paraptila argocosma is a species of moth of the family Tortricidae. It is found in Colombia.

The length of the forewings is about 11.5 mm. The ground colour of the forewings is dark red brown in the basal area, narrowly bordered by white distally. There is a light purple-grey lateral band with light tan-orange striae. The ground colour of the remaining area are orange mixed with red brown and streaks of white. The hindwings are white with uniform light grey-brown overscaling.

References

Moths described in 1912
Euliini